Leanne Rowe (born 1982) is an English actress and singer, known for portraying Nancy in Oliver Twist, May Moss in Lilies and Baby in Dirty Dancing: The Classic Story on Stage.

Background
Rowe is from Brentwood, Essex. She has two older sisters and a brother.

Rowe left school at the age of 16 to train as a dancer, attending Laine Theatre Arts. She graduated at the age of 19 with honours in musical theatre. Rowe also studied Drama, and after graduating, chose to pursue a career in acting instead of dance.

Career
Rowe made her film and professional debut at the age of 12, playing Helen Burns in Franco Zeffirelli's Jane Eyre. In 2005 she was chosen by Roman Polanski to play Nancy in his adaptation of Oliver Twist. Her television credits include Boudica, The Famous Five and Where the Heart Is. She also played the lead role of May Moss in the Liverpool-set BBC One drama Lilies.

Rowe's radio drama work includes Avoid London, Loving, Forget Me Not, One Chord Wonders, Roald Dahl's The Witches and To Sir with Love.

Rowe made her West End debut in Dirty Dancing: The Classic Story on Stage, playing the lead role of Frances 'Baby' Houseman. In 2009 she appeared in the revival of Victoria Wood's Talent at the Menier Chocolate Factory, playing Julie.

Filmography

Television

Film

Theatre

References

External links

People from Brentwood, Essex
English television actresses
English musical theatre actresses
English film actresses
English radio actresses
1982 births
Living people